The 30th Miss Chinese International Pageant, Miss Chinese International Pageant 2019 was held on March 2, 2019. Miss Chinese International 2018 Rose Li of New York City, USA  crowned her successor Hera Chan of Hong Kong at the end of the pageant.

Pageant information
The slogan to this year's pageant was "Next-level beauty causes jealousy, but hiding beauty is the actual hypocrisy" 「靚得離地 令人妒忌  隱藏美麗 才是虛偽」.  The masters of ceremony this year were actor Andrew Yuen Man-kit, Miss Hong Kong 2015 Louisa Mak, and presenter Luk Ho Ming.  Once again, there were two judging panels this year, along with the main judging panel is the Elegant Judging Panel.  Both panels solely consist of Hong Kong celebrities associated with organizer TVB.   The Elegant Judging Panel do not interfere with the actual scoring of the pageant, rather provide the viewers of how the delegates fared during each round of competition in the minds of those celebrities on the panel, both the top scorers, and the underperformers.

There were several firsts in the placement of this year's pageant.  With Stephanie Wang crowned first runner-up, this is the first time Hawaii has ever been placed in the top three since their involvement in the pageant in 1995.  Also, Morgane Yueng became Tahiti's first representative ever to place in the top 5 since the first iteration of the pageant back in 1988, and the first placement since Lai-Chun Kwong placed in the top 12 in Miss Chinese International Pageant 1992. Additionally, Lisa He became London's first representative ever to place in the top 5 since the first iteration of the pageant back in 1988, and the first placement since Roro Chen placed in the top 10 in Miss Chinese International Pageant 2012.

Judges
Christine Kuo, Miss Chinese International 2009
Kelly Cheung, Miss Chinese International 2012
Rebecca Zhu, Miss Hong Kong 2011
Moses Chan, actor
Joe Ma, actor

Results

Special awards

Contestant list

Crossovers
Contestants who previously competed or will be competing at other international beauty pageants:

Miss International
 2022: : Tavee Meesang

References

External links 
 Miss Chinese International Pageant 2019 Official Site

2019 in Hong Kong
2019 beauty pageants
Beauty pageants in Hong Kong
March 2019 events in China
Miss Chinese International Pageants
TVB